The Secret of My Success (sometimes stylized as The Secret of My Succe$s) is a 1987 American comedy film produced and directed by Herbert Ross and starring Michael J. Fox and Helen Slater. The screenplay was written by A.J. Carothers, Jim Cash and Jack Epps Jr. from a story written by Carothers. It was filmed on location in Manhattan.

Plot
Brantley Foster is a recent graduate of Kansas State University who moves to New York City, where he has accepted an entry-level job as a financier. Upon arriving, he discovers that the company for which he is supposed to work has been taken over by a rival corporation. As a result, Brantley is laid off before even starting work.

After several interviews for another job, he is unsuccessful due to over- or underqualification, or having no experience. Brantley ends up working in the mailroom of the Pemrose Corporation, directed by his "uncle" Howard Prescott, a distant relative he's never met. Pemrose was founded by Howard's father-in-law. Howard achieved the presidency by marrying his boss's daughter, Vera Pemrose.

After inspecting company reports, Brantley realizes that Howard and most of his fellow "suits" (executives) are making pointless or damaging decisions. He notices an empty office in the building due to one of Howard's frequent firings. Using his access to the mailroom and his understanding of the company, he creates and assumes the identity of Carlton Whitfield, a new executive.

While handling two jobs (switching between casual apparel and business suits in the elevator), Brantley sparks romantic interest from Christy Wills, a fellow financial wizard who recently graduated from Harvard. He meets Vera by driving her home in a company limo at his employer's request. She persuades him to stay for a swim and seduces him. 

Seeing Howard arrive, Brantley and Vera realize they are related by marriage. She had seduced him out of revenge against her husband for having an affair with a woman at the office. Brantley changes as fast as he can and narrowly escapes the mansion without being spotted by Howard.

Howard, unbeknownst to Brantley, is having an affair with Christy. When Howard asks her to spy on Carlton Whitfield he suspects as a corporate spy for Donald Davenport, she falls in love with "Whitfield", not knowing he is actually Brantley. The Pemrose Corporation is preparing for its impending takeover by the Davenport Corporation. If Davenport Corporation absorbs Pemrose, all workers get fired. Howard, unaware that Whitfield and Brantley are the same person, suspects "Whitfield" is a spy for corporate raider Davenport. 

Brantley's double identity is discovered when he, Christy, Vera and Howard end up in the same bedroom after a party at Howard's home that all four are attending. Brantley and Christy end their blossoming relationship. He gets fired from his job as Whitfield, as does Christy for refusing to continue her affair with Howard. Vera is divorcing Howard, since she found out about his affair with Christy and his plan to propose to her.

While both Christy and Brantley are moving out of their offices, they end up in the same elevator and reconcile, conceiving a revenge plan together with Vera. They raise enough cash, bonds, and stocks to take control of the Pemrose Corporation, and to proceed with a hostile takeover bid of Davenport's corporation. 

Vera, already hating Howard for his inept business practices which were driving her father's empire into the ground, tells the board about his affair with Christy. Vera promptly replaces him with Brantley, with Jean (Carlton's secretary), Christy and Melrose (Brantley's mailroom colleague) at his side. While security guards escort Howard and his aide, Art Thomas, from the Pemrose Building, Brantley and Christy start planning their future together, personal as well as professional.

Cast

 Michael J. Fox as Brantley Foster/Carlton Whitfield
 Helen Slater as Christy Wills
 Richard Jordan as Howard Prescott
 Margaret Whitton as Vera Pemrose Prescott
 John Pankow as Fred Melrose
 Fred Gwynne as Donald Davenport
 Gerry Bamman as Art Thomas
 Carol Ann Susi as Jean
 Drew Snyder as Burt Foster
 Elizabeth Franz as Grace Foster
 Christopher Murney as Barney Rattigan
 Mark Margolis as Elevator Repairman
 Mercedes Ruehl as Sheila
 Cindy Crawford as Model in opening montage
 Bruce McGill as W. Shaw (uncredited)
 Bill Fagerbakke as Ron

Soundtrack

The soundtrack was released on LP and cassette tape on April 10, 1987. Seven of the 10 tracks were produced, and either written or co-written, by David Foster, who also scored the film and has three tracks of his own on the album.

Not all of the songs featured in the film are included on the soundtrack, or, at least not in the same version. The film version of the song "The Secret of My Success" is slightly different, and also features a mini-instrumental version. The film version of "I Burn for You" does not feature vocals, whereas the soundtrack version does. The "Restless Heart" track from the film has a different title ("Something I Gotta Do"), and different lyrics than the soundtrack version.

Popular songs "Walking on Sunshine" by Katrina & The Waves and "Oh Yeah" by Yello are heard in the film but do not appear on the soundtrack.

The soundtrack peaked at No. 131 on the Billboard 200.

The theme from the picture "The Secret of My Success", performed by Night Ranger, was one of the songs that competed for the Golden Globe Award for Best Original Song in 1988. The winner was "(I've Had) The Time of My Life", the theme from Dirty Dancing, performed by Bill Medley and Jennifer Warnes.

Track listing
 "The Secret of My Success" (performed by Night Ranger)
 "Sometimes the Good Guys Finish First" (performed by Pat Benatar)
 "I Burn for You" (performed by Danny Peck and Nancy Shanks)
 "Riskin' a Romance" (performed by Bananarama)
 "Gazebo" (performed by David Foster)
 "The Price of Love" (performed by Roger Daltrey)
 "Water Fountain" (performed by David Foster)
 "Don't Ask the Reason Why" (performed by Restless Heart)
 "3 Themes" (performed by David Foster)
 "Heaven and the Heartaches" (performed by Taxxi)

Reception

Critical response
The film received a mixed response from critics.
Roger Ebert in the Chicago Sun-Times wrote, "The Secret of My Success seems trapped in some kind of time warp, as if the screenplay had been in a drawer since the 1950s and nobody bothered to update it." He concluded "Fox provides a fairly desperate center for the film. It could not have been much fun for him to follow the movie's arbitrary shifts of mood, from sitcom to slapstick, from sex farce to boardroom brawls."

However, Vincent Canby, writing in The New York Times, felt it was "close to inspired when the ambitious Brantley finds himself leading two lives", although he noted that "Hanging over The Secret of My Success is the long shadow of Frank Loesser's classic musical How to Succeed in Business Without Really Trying."

 On Metacritic, the film has a rating of 36/100 based on 16 critics, indicating "generally unfavorable reviews". Audiences polled by CinemaScore gave the film an average grade of "B+" on an A+ to F scale.

Box office
The film opened on April 10, 1987, and debuted at number one at the box office, taking $7.8 million in its opening weekend. It stayed at No. 1 for 5 weeks, and was in the top ten films for 2 months. It grossed $66,995,000 in the US, becoming the 7th highest-grossing film in the United States for the year 1987, and outgrossing such films as RoboCop, Predator, Lethal Weapon and Dirty Dancing. The film went on to gross an additional $44,001,000 worldwide, giving it a total of $111 million. Additionally, the film made  through video rentals.

Musical 
In 2020 a musical based on the film was mid-run for its world premiere and pre-Broadway tryout at the Paramount Theatre in March 2020 with Sydney Morton (Christy Lockhart) and Billy Harrigan Tighe (Brantley Foster/Carlton Whitfield) as leads and Greenberg directing when production was shut down due to the coronavirus pandemic. It had been scheduled to run from February 21 – March 29, and the final performance was March 12, as Illinois governor J. B. Pritzker shut down all performance venues starting March 13.

References

External links

 
 
 
 

1987 films
1987 comedy films
American comedy films
American business films
1980s English-language films
Films about businesspeople
Films directed by Herbert Ross
Films scored by David Foster
Films set in New York City
Films shot in New York City
Universal Pictures films
1980s business films
Films set in offices
1980s American films